Cyclomia is a genus of moths in the family Geometridae.

Species
 Cyclomia mopsaria Guenée, 1857

References

 Cyclomia at Markku Savela's Lepidoptera and Some Other Life Forms
 Natural History Museum Lepidoptera genus database

Ennominae
Geometridae genera